Oleksiy Mykhaylovych Pospyelov is a Ukrainian retired footballer.

Career
Andrey Kandaurov, started his career with CSKA Kyiv in 2007, where he played 11 match. In summer 2008 he moved to Feniks-Illichovets Kalinine where he played 8 matches and scored 1 goal. In january 2009 he moved Knyazha-2 Shchaslyve, the reserve team of Knyazha Shchaslyve in the village of Shchaslyve (to the west of Boryspil), here he played 16 matches and scored 1 goal. In summer 2009 he moved to Desna Chernihiv the club in the city of Chernihiv in Ukrainian First League where in the season 2009–10 he played 23 matches and scored 1 goal but the team was relegated in Ukrainian Second League. Then in summer 2011, he moved to Obolon Kyiv where he played 2 matches and in the same season has been sent to Obolon-2 Kyiv the reserve squad.

References

External links 
 Oleksiy Pospyelov footballfacts.ru
 Oleksiy Pospyelov allplayers.in.ua
 

1990 births
Living people
FC CSKA Kyiv players
FC Feniks-Illichovets Kalinine players
FC Knyazha-2 Shchaslyve players
FC Desna Chernihiv players
FC Obolon-Brovar Kyiv players
FC Obolon-2 Kyiv players
FC Dinaz Vyshhorod players
FC Arsenal Kyiv players
FC Yednist Plysky players 
FC Avanhard Bziv players 
Ukrainian footballers
Ukrainian First League players
Ukrainian Second League players
Ukrainian Amateur Football Championship players
Association football midfielders